Dark Money: The Hidden History of the Billionaires Behind the Rise of the Radical Right is a 2016 non-fiction book written by American investigative journalist Jane Mayer. The book focuses on a network of extremely wealthy conservative Republicans, foremost among them Charles and David Koch, who have together funded an array of organizations that work in tandem to influence academic institutions, think tanks, the courts, statehouses, Congress, and the American presidency for their own benefit. Mayer particularly discusses the Koch family and their political activities, along with Richard Mellon Scaife, John M. Olin, the Bradley brothers, as well as the DeVos and Coors families and their related foundations.

See also
Citizen Koch (2013) documentary film
Company Town
Koch Brothers Exposed
 Democracy in Chains (2017)
 Kochland (2019)

References

Further reading
 

2016 non-fiction books
Economics books
Books critical of capitalism
Books about politics of the United States
Doubleday (publisher) books
Books about the Kochs
J. Anthony Lukas Book Prize-winning works
Helen Bernstein Book Award for Excellence in Journalism